Frank Hsieh Chang-ting (born May 18, 1946) is a Taiwanese politician and former defense attorney. A cofounder of the Democratic Progressive Party, he has served on the Taipei City Council, the Legislative Yuan, as the mayor of Kaohsiung City, and as the Premier of the Republic of China under president Chen Shui-bian. Hsieh was the DPP nominee in the 2008 presidential election and was defeated by Ma Ying-jeou. Hsieh is currently the head of the Association of Taiwan-Japan Relations.

Early life
Born in Dadaocheng, Taipei, in 1946, Hsieh was a gymnast in high school and worked as a food vendor before college. He received a Bachelor of Laws degree from National Taiwan University. Hsieh then obtained a master's degree and later completed doctoral coursework (all but dissertation) in jurisprudence at Graduate School of Law, Kyoto University in Japan. He was a practicing attorney from 1969 to 1981, serving as a defense attorney in the martial courts following the Kaohsiung Incident of 1980.

Rise in politics
Prior to the 1986 establishment of the Democratic Progressive Party, Hsieh, Chen Shui-bian and Lin Cheng-chieh were known as the "three musketeers" of the tangwai movement. Hsieh cofounded the party and was the one who proposed its current name. He has also served as its chairman twice. A two-time Taipei City councilor from 1981 to 1988, Hsieh was then elected to the Legislative Yuan, the next year, and won reelection in 1992. Instead of running for reelection in the 1995 legislative elections, Hsieh chose to run in the 1994 Taipei mayoral election, and lost a primary to eventual winner Chen Shui-bian. In September 1995, Peng Ming-min and Hsieh were placed on the Democratic Progressive Party ticket for the 1996 presidential election. They finished second with 21.1% of the vote.

Kaohsiung mayoralty
In 1997, Hsieh successfully negotiated the surrender of the gunman in the Alexander family hostage crisis, raising his national profile.

To the surprise of many observers, Hsieh won the 1998 Kaohsiung City mayoral election, and defeated the Kuomintang incumbent, Wu Den-yih, by 4,565 votes. His administration focused on improving water quality in surrounding rivers as well as a general overhaul of the port of Kaohsiung. Hsieh supported placing the port, at the time run largely by the central government, under the jurisdiction of Kaohsiung City Government. Under Hsieh's leadership efforts to clean up the heavily polluted Love River began in 1999, and ended in 2002. He was also largely responsible for the establishment of the Kaohsiung Metro. These achievements helped Hsieh earn strong support among Kaohsiung citizens. He was re-elected for a four-year term in 2002. Hsieh was projected to win easily, but People First Party chair James Soong publicly supported Kuomintang candidate Huang Jun-ying, which helped Huang earn more votes. Hsieh defeated Huang by 24,838 votes (3.22%).

Premiership and aftermath
In January 2005, Hsieh was appointed premier, forcing him to leave his post as mayor of Kaohsiung. Chen Chi-mai succeeded him as acting mayor.

Kuomintang politicians asked Hsieh to step down from the premiership shortly after the Kaohsiung MRT foreign workers scandal broke. Hsieh eventually resigned as premier in the aftermath of the 2005 "Three-in-One" elections, which the DPP lost in a landslide.

As the DPP candidate for the 2006 Taipei Mayoral election, Hsieh lost the race to KMT candidate Hau Lung-pin by 166,216 votes (12.92%). The loss was largely expected, as Taipei was considered a Kuomintang stronghold.

In February 2007, he led the Taiwanese delegation to the 55th annual United States National Prayer Breakfast in Washington, D.C., hosted by the U.S. Congressional Committee, with dignitaries including President George W. Bush.

2008 presidential campaign

Hsieh was frequently considered to be a leading contender for the DPP nomination in the 2008 presidential election, and formally announced his intention to run in the election on February 16, 2007. Hsieh was the second to formally declared candidacy, after the Kuomintang's Ma Ying-jeou did so three days prior. Hsieh won 45% of the vote in the Democratic Progressive Party primary. A scheduled straw poll was cancelled after his three primary opponents all conceded defeat, and Hsieh was declared the DPP nominee. In July 2007, Hsieh visited the United States, branding it "the journey of Love and Trust". In September 2007, Hsieh openly declared that he was running for the presidency of the State of Taiwan, saying that "recogniz[ing] ourselves (the Taiwanese people) as a nation first and then fight[ing] for what we want during negotiations with other countries" is important. As a result of the Kuomintang's allegations of graft against Hsieh, prosecutors began an investigation of him in 2007. The investigation ended in September, when it was announced that Hsieh would not be charged with wrongdoing.

Regarding Ma Ying-jeou's idea of a "cross-strait common market," Hsieh states that if Taiwan only focuses on the economy, it will end up like Hong Kong and Macau, whose only goal in life is to make money. Hsieh believes that improving the economy is as important as preserving national dignity, and that the goal of economic development is more than just making money, but it is also improving the happiness of people.

Following the DPP's poor performance in the 2008 legislative election, Hsieh replaced Chen Shui-bian as party chairman.

In January 2008, Hsieh accused candidate Ma Ying-jeou of having a United States green card. Subsequent investigations revealed that one of Ma's sisters and one of his two daughters are US citizens. Hsieh stated that if Ma made public documented proof that he had renounced the green card, Hsieh would withdraw from the election.

The election was devastating to Hsieh and the DPP because he lost by a wider-than-expected margin of 17%. Hsieh had stated that if he lost this election, he would not run for office again. He resigned from the DPP chairmanship to take responsibility for the defeat. Tsai Ing-wen was elected as the new chairperson of the DPP.

In July 2010, Hsieh stood for the DPP's central committee standing membership election and won.

Cross-strait relations

2012 mainland visit

In October 2012, Hsieh went to mainland China for five days as the highest-ranking DPP official ever to visit. However, the trip was made in no political capacity, but rather as a private citizen. He visited Xiamen and the Dongshan Islands in Fujian as well as Beijing on October 4–8.

He met with then State Councilor Dai Bingguo, then President Chen Yunlin of the Association for Relations Across the Taiwan Straits and then Director Wang Yi of the Taiwan Affairs Office.

Although both sides agreed on the One-China policy, which governs Cross-Strait relations, Hsieh prefers to have a new consensus he called  instead of the 1992 consensus.

Hsieh reiterated his "Two Sides, Two Constitutions" initiative while on an April 2013 visit to the United States, and urged Beijing to accept difference across the Taiwan Strait for both sides being able to facilitate dialogue.

Hong Kong cross-strait forum

In late June 2013, Hsieh attended a two-day forum on cross-strait relations entitled "Development and Innovation of Cross-Strait Relations" in Hong Kong. The forum was co-organized by Taiwan-based Taiwan Reform Foundation and Beijing-based Taiwan Research Institute. Before the forum, Hsieh attended a dinner hosted by Tung Chee Hwa, former Chief Executive of Hong Kong on Friday evening.

Hsieh said that mutual trust between DPP and Beijing was important and that all of the bilateral exchanges between the two sides of the Taiwan Strait should benefit the public and address their needs. He also added that rebalancing cross-strait interactions is important as well. He once again reiterated his 'constitutions with different interpretations' view that Taipei and Beijing can coexist if both sides respect each other's constitutional legitimacy.

ROC representative to Japan
In March 2016, local media began reporting that Hsieh had accepted a position as Taiwan's representative to Japan in Tsai Ing-wen's administration. He announced the appointment in late April, and made his first official visit to Japan on June 9. Ko Shu-ling of the Kyodo News wrote favorably of Hsieh's appointment, stating that the focus on Cross-Strait and Taiwan–United States relations under previous administrations seemed to be rolled back in favor of a "southward" policy, a goal of the Tsai presidency. Hsieh has discussed the possible lifting of Taiwanese restrictions on imports from Fukushima Prefecture, which had been put in place as a result of the 2011 Tōhoku earthquake and tsunami, the cause of meltdowns at the Fukushima Daiichi nuclear power plant.

Personal life
Hsieh is married to Yu Fang-chih; together, they have a daughter and a son, who served in the military on Tungyin Island (Dongyin) and has served as Taipei City councilor since 2014. Hsieh's mother died in 2007.

Hsieh and nine other Democratic Progressive Party politicians performed traditional Taiwanese songs on a re-release of the album Oh! Formosa in 2000. He later learned to play the ocarina, and released his own album in 2005.

Hsieh first claimed part-aboriginal descent in 2005, and stated that he enjoyed Bunun music.

He is also of seventh generation native Taiwanese of Hoklo descent; his ancestor Hsieh Kuang-yu migrated from Tongshan, a village in Fujian province, the ancestral hometown being Zhao'an County (now part of Dongshan County).

Explanatory notes

References

External links

 Personal website

1946 births
Living people
Cheng Kung Senior High School alumni
Democratic Progressive Party chairpersons
Democratic Progressive Party presidential nominees
Mayors of Kaohsiung
Taiwanese Buddhists
Taiwanese Taoists
Taiwanese people of Hoklo descent
Members of the 1st Legislative Yuan in Taiwan
National Taiwan University alumni
Politicians of the Republic of China on Taiwan from Taipei
Premiers of the Republic of China on Taiwan
Kyoto University alumni
Members of the Kuomintang
Members of the 2nd Legislative Yuan
Members of the 3rd Legislative Yuan
Democratic Progressive Party Members of the Legislative Yuan
Taipei Members of the Legislative Yuan
Representatives of Taiwan to Japan
Taipei City Councilors